Vitis ficifolia is a species of liana in the grape family native to the Asian temperate climate zone. It is found in mainland China (Hebei, Henan, Jiangsu, Shaanxi, Shandong and Shanxi provinces), Japan (prefectures of Hokkaido, Honshu, Kyushu, Shikoku and Ryukyu Islands), Taiwan and the Koreas.

References

ficifolia
Flora of China
Flora of Japan
Flora of the Ryukyu Islands
Flora of Korea
Flora of Taiwan
Taxa named by Alexander von Bunge